Spatuloricaria atratoensis is a species of catfish in the family Loricariidae. It is native to South America, where it occurs in the Atrato River basin in Colombia. The species reaches 34 cm (13.4 inches) in standard length.

References 

Loricariini
Fish described in 1944
Catfish of South America
Freshwater fish of Colombia
Taxa named by Leonard Peter Schultz